Elizabeth J. Kelly is an American statistician who works at the Los Alamos National Laboratory on statistical problems in environmental assessment, environmental remediation, and plutonium storage and disposal.

Education and career
Kelly majored in mathematics at the University of Southern California, graduating in 1965. She stayed at the University of Southern California for a master's degree in mathematics, earned in 1967, completed a Ph.D. in biostatistics at the University of California, Los Angeles in 1984, and joined the Los Alamos National Laboratory research staff in 1985.

Recognition
In 2016, Kelly was elected as a Fellow of the American Statistical Association (ASA), associated with the ASA Section on Statistics in Defense and National Security. She is a 2020 winner of the ASA Statistics in Physical Engineering Sciences Award, shared with two other Los Alamos statisticians, Kirk Veirs and Brian Weaver.

References

Year of birth missing (living people)
Living people
American statisticians
American women statisticians
University of Southern California alumni
University of California, Los Angeles alumni
Los Alamos National Laboratory personnel
Fellows of the American Statistical Association
21st-century American women